Mehran Ibrahim (born 20 November 1993) is a Pakistani first-class cricketer who plays for Peshawar.

References

External links
 

1993 births
Living people
Pakistani cricketers
Peshawar cricketers
Cricketers from Peshawar